People's Will, formerly known as Sovereign European Ukraine, was a centrist, pro-Europe Ukrainian parliamentary faction in its national parliament Verkhovna Rada.

History

Sovereign European Ukraine
The faction Sovereign European Ukraine was founded on 27 February 2014. It was founded by MP Ihor Yeremeyev who had till then had not been a member of any faction. The group included 35 MPs. Most of them had been, like Yeremeyev, unaffiliated. According to Yeremeyev not wanting a ministerial post had been one of the conditions that needed to be met to join the faction when it was established.

On its first day the faction with 250 other MPs sign up to join the coalition supporting the Yatsenyuk Government with the Batkivshchyna, UDAR, Svoboda factions and the Economic Development faction and other MPs.

The main policy aim of the faction were European integration and lustration, which is the purge of government officials associated with the past Communist system.

People's Will
The parliamentary group was revived after the 2014 parliamentary elections in Ukraine by Yeremeyev; but was renamed "People's Will". The new leader of the parliamentary group was again Yeremeyev. Its initial strength was 20 MPs. Late October 2016 the group counted 19 MPs.

Following the 2019 Ukrainian parliamentary election the faction was not revived in the 9th Ukrainian Verkhovna Rada.

Members

Leaders
 2014–2015: Ihor Yeremeyev
 2015–2019: Yaroslav Moskalenko

See also
 Petro Dyminskyi (WOG (gas stations), Karpaty Lviv, Western Information Corporation ZIK)

References

External links
 Official website 

Parliamentary groups in Ukraine
Defunct political party alliances in Ukraine
2014 establishments in Ukraine
2019 disestablishments in Ukraine
Euromaidan